This list contains proposals for space telescopes, space-based (situated in space) astronomical observatories.  It is a list of past and present space observatory plans, concepts, and proposals.  For observatories in orbit, see list of space telescopes.  Unlike that list, this one includes concepts and proposals that are unlikely ever to be launched, as they may have been cancelled or were only proposals.

Space observatories under development

Merged, cancelled, or superseded space observatories

Additional examples and non-space telescopes 
For launch in the 2030s, NASA is evaluating four possible designs:  the Origins Space Telescope, Lynx X-ray Surveyor, Habitable Exoplanet Imaging Mission (HabEx), and Large UV Optical Infrared Surveyor (LUVOIR).

Balloon-borne telescopes have been in use since the 1950s. A 20–30 meter balloon telescope has been suggested. The balloon would be transparent on one side, and have a circular reflecting mirror on the other side. There are two main designs using this principle.
Large Balloon Reflector (LBR) (sub-orbital version)
Space-based Large Balloon Reflector (LBR) 
TeraHertz Space Telescope (TST)

Additional examples     
     
     
 Aditya-L1
 Advanced Telescope for High Energy Astrophysics (ATHENA)
 Big Bang Observer
 Cosmological Advanced Survey Telescope for Optical and UV Research (CASTOR)
 Deci-hertz Interferometer Gravitational wave Observatory (DECIGO)
 EChO
 Fast INfrared Exoplanet Spectroscopy Survey Explorer (FINESSE)
 Gravity and Extreme Magnetism (GEMS) 
Habitable Exoplanet Imaging Mission (HabEx), a large UV to NIR focused design, 4 meter mirror 
 LOFT - Large Observatory For X-ray Timing 
 Large Ultraviolet Optical Infrared Surveyor
 Large Interferometer For Exoplanets
 Nautilus Deep Space Observatory
 Near-Earth Object Surveillance Mission (formerly Near-Earth Object Camera (NEOcam))
 PEGASE
 Planetary Dynamics Explorer
 Space Infrared Telescope for Cosmology and Astrophysics (SPICA)
 Telescope for Habitable Exoplanets and Interstellar/Intergalactic Astronomy (THEIA)
 THESEUS
 Waypoint-1 Space Telescope, visible light, UV and hyper-spectral imaging for astrophysical research and ground observation
 Whipple, proposed transit telescope for KBO and Oort objects
 ZEBRA, Zodiacal dust, Extragalactic Background and Reionization Apparatus  A small infrared observatory sent out to 10 AU by NASA

Design studies
      
Four NASA Design studies from 2018:

The Lynx X-ray Observatory (Lynx), an X-ray telescope orders of magnitude more powerful than any previous design
The Large Ultraviolet Optical Infrared Surveyor (LUVOIR), a large optical UV to near infrared design with 15 meters aperture mirror
The Habitable Exoplanet Observatory (HabEx), a large UV to NIR focused design and potential starshade
The Origins Space Telescope (OST), a powerful infrared space observatory concept

Various proposals or concepts for high-energy light observatories (circa 2010s):

 AdEPT: Advanced Energetic Pair Telescope:  pair production telescope concept for gamma-ray polarimetry
 AEGIS: Astrophysics Experiment for Grating and Imaging Spectroscopy,  soft X-ray spectrometer.
 APT: Advanced Pair Telescope 
 Arcus,  X-ray spectrometer concept for International Space Station
 ASCOT: Advanced Scintillator Compton Telescope
 A-STAR: All-Sky Transient Astrophysics Explorer 
 Athena, an X-ray observatory 
 AXSIO: Advanced X-ray Spectroscopic Imaging Observatory
 AXTAR: Advanced X-Ray Timing Array,  X-ray timing mission 
 BEST: Black Hole Evolution and Space-Time Observatory (include deep hard X-ray imaging (5 – 70 keV))
 BHI: Black Hole Imager
 Black Hole Finder
 CASTER: Coded Aperture Survey Telescope for Energetic Radiation
 EDGE: Explorer of Diffuse emission and Gamma ray burst Explosions
 EPE: Extreme Physics Explorer
 EREXS: Epoch of Reionization Energetic X-ray Survey
 EXIST: Energetic X-ray Imaging Survey Telescope
 Gen-X: The Generation X-Ray Mission
 GRAVITAS: General Relativistic Astrophysics Via Timing and Spectroscopy
 HEX-P: High-Energy X-ray Probe
 INSIST: Indian Spectroscopic Imaging Space Telescope (UV)
 ISS-Lobster
 IXPE: Imaging X-ray Polarimetry Explorer (launched Dec 2021)
 MIRAX: Monitor e Imageador de Raios X
 NHXM: New Hard X-ray Mission
 Pharos
 PheniX,  focussing X-ray telescope concept
 PRAXyS: Polarimetry of Relativistic X-ray Sources
 SAHARA: Spectral Analysis with High Angular Resolution Astronomy
 SMART-X: Square Meter, Arcsecond Resolution X-ray Telescope
 Tsubame,  micro-satellite for X-ray polarimetry 
 WhimEx: Warm-Hot Inter-Galactic Medium Explorer
 WFXIS: Wide-Field X-ray Imaging Spectrometer
 WFXT: Wide-Field X-ray Telescope
 Xenia: a Probe of Cosmic Chemical Evolution
 XIPE: the X-ray Imaging Polarimetry Explorer (ESA)
 X-Ray Surveyor

Gallery

See also
 Lists of telescopes
 Lists of spacecraft

References

External links
 Video (86:49) – "Search for Life in the Universe" – NASA (July 14, 2014).

space observatories
space observatories
space observatories